Tij, TIJ, or variations may refer to:

 Tijuana International Airport (General Abelardo L. Rodríguez International Airport), Baja California, Mexico, IATA code
 Tilung language (ISO 639 code: tij)
 Tij, Nepalese women's festival
 Thermal inkjet (TIj), an inkjet technology
 "Tij", a song from the 2007 album Mirrored by U.S. rock band Battles

See also
 TLJ (disambiguation)
 Tijs, a Dutch given name